Odontadenia geminata is a species of plant in the family Apocynaceae. It is found in the 3 Guianas, Venezuela, Colombia, Ecuador, Peru, Bolivia and North Brazil.

References

External links
 Odontadenia geminata at The Plant List

Odontadenieae
Flora of South America